Jonathan C. Friedman (born 1966) is a history professor and director of Holocaust and Genocide Studies at West Chester University.

Books 
 The Lion and the Star: Gentile–Jewish Relations in Three Hessian Communities (1998)
 Rainbow Jews: Gay and Jewish Identity in the Performing Arts (2007)

References

1966 births
West Chester University faculty
Historians of the Holocaust
Jewish historians
Historians of Europe
Living people